Eleven Mile or Elevenmile may refer to:

Eleven Mile State Park, in Colorado
Elevenmile Creek, in Alaska

Eleven mile challenge is often faced by YouTubers or online people